Santoña Club de Fútbol is a football team based in Santoña in the autonomous community of Cantabria. Founded in 1917, it plays in the Tercera División – Group 3. Its stadium is El Paloma with a capacity of 4,500 seats.

Season to season

1 seasons in Segunda División B
43 seasons in Tercera División

Famous players
 Pedro Munitis

External links
Official website 

Football clubs in Cantabria
Association football clubs established in 1917
1917 establishments in Spain